In the 1999–2000 season, USM Alger is competing in the Super Division for the 20th time, as well as the Algerian Cup.  It is their 5th consecutive season in the top flight of Algerian football. They will be competing in Ligue 1, the Algerian Cup, Algerian League Cup, CAF Cup, and the African Cup Winners' Cup. 1999–2000 season was the worst season since the rise of the Red and Black and finished in last place and Rabah Saâdane was dismissed from his position as coach after he had failed to achieve what was required in all competitions but in this season, there was no fall to the second division, Saïd Allik stated that it is an opportunity to inject new life into the team in order to gain control of Algerian football, also USM Alger disqualified in 2000 African Cup Winners' Cup to be punished not to participate in any African competition for one year because of the participation an ineligible of goalkeeper Burkinabé Siaka Coulibaly against JS du Ténéré. in the Algerian League Cup arrived to the semi-final round and lost to CR Belouizdad.

Squad list
Players and squad numbers last updated on 1 September 1999.Note: Flags indicate national team as has been defined under FIFA eligibility rules. Players may hold more than one non-FIFA nationality.

Competitions

Overview

Super Division

League table

Results summary

Results by round

Matches

Algerian Cup

Algerian League Cup

Group stage

Knockout stage

CAF Cup

Quarter-finals

African Cup Winners' Cup

First round

Squad information

Appearances and goals
Only 14 games from 22 in National appearances 

|-

Goalscorers
Includes all competitive matches. The list is sorted alphabetically by surname when total goals are equal.

Clean sheets
Includes all competitive matches.

Transfers

In

Out

Notes

References

USM Alger seasons
Algerian football clubs 1999–2000 season